Angus Cameron , (born 1966) is a BAFTA Scotland nominated director.

Cameron's first documentary, Ibiza - A Short Film About Chilling, is a 'classic' record of the Ibiza club scene in 1990.

He is best known for his association with Creation Records during the 1990s, where he made music videos for Ride, My Bloody Valentine, Cathedral, Primal Scream and others. Several of his videos are known for having a distinctive psychedelic visual style.

Cameron was also given a credit for photography on Loveless which later featured in a Supreme release (2020) and created short films to accompany My Bloody Valentine's concerts, beginning with the Rollercoaster Tour. Of working with the band, he said: "I had my best and most creative working relationship with My Bloody Valentine."

Since the early 1990s he has directed several television series and documentaries, most notably Naked Ambition and Hollywood Confidential.

Filmography 
Ibiza - A Short Film About Chilling (1990) Channel 4 Documentary.
Band Explosion (1991) TV Series
The Story of Creation (1992) Video Documentary
Run (1995) Channel 4 TV Movie Documentary 
Lonely Planet (1999-2001) TV Series - 3 episodes
Treks in a Wide World (2000) TV Series - 1 episode
Miami Nice (2000) TV Movie Documentary
Madonna - Naked Ambition (2000) Channel 4 TV Movie Documentary
The Hollywood Greats (2002-2003) BBC One TV Series Documentary - 2 episodes
Hollywood Confidential (2003) BBC Four TV Movie Documentary 
Days That Shook The World (2004-2005) BBC Two TV Series Documentary - 2 episodes
Time Commanders (2005) BBC Two TV Series Documentary - All 8 episodes of series 2
Serial Killers (2006) TV Series Documentary - 1 episode
British Film Forever (2007) TV Series Documentary - All 7 episodes
Wildest Dreams (2009) BBC One TV Series Documentary - All 7 episodes
Fatal Attractions (2013) Animal Planet TV Series - 1 episode
Crazy Love (2013) TV Movie Documentary

Nominations
Days That Shook The World - Disaster in the Skies: The Hindenberg/Challenger Disaster (2004) - Nominated for Best Factual Programme - BAFTA Scotland Awards 2005 (Writer, Cinematographer and Director)

Videography
Loop - "Collision" (1989)
Thee Hypnotics - "Soul Trader" (1989)
The Jack Rubies - "Wrecker" (1989)
The Farm - "All Together Now" (1990)
The Family Cat - "Remember" (1990)
The Family Cat - "A Place With A Name" (1990)
The Jazz Butcher - "Girl Go" (1990)
Hypnotone - "Dream Beam" (1990)
The Heart Throbs - "Dream Time" (1990)
Ride - "Chelsea Girl" (1990)
Ride - "Like a Daydream" (1990)
Ride - "Taste" (1990)
Primal Scream - "Loaded" (1990)
Primal Scream - "Come Together" (1990)
Primal Scream - "Don't Fight It, Feel It" (1991)
My Bloody Valentine - "Soon" (1990)
My Bloody Valentine - "Swallow" (1991)
My Bloody Valentine - "To Here Knows When" (1991)
My Bloody Valentine - "Only Shallow" (1991)
The House of Love - "Marble" (1991)
The Fat Lady Sings - "Arclight" (1991)
The Fat Lady Sings - "Twist" (1991)
Bill Pritchard - "Number 5" (1991)
Five Thirty - "13th Disciple" (1991)
All About Eve - "The Dreamer" (1991)
The Family Cat - "Colour Me Grey" (1991)
The Family Cat - "Steamroller" (1992)
Sweet Jesus - "Phonefreak Honey" (1992)
The Lilac Time - "Dreaming" (1992)
Kerry Shaw - "Could This Be Love?" (1992)
Swervedriver - "Never Lose That Feeling" (1992)
Carter the Unstoppable Sex Machine - "Glam Rock Cops" (1992)
"Putting Our House in Order" Project (Charity) - "Gimme Shelter" (1992)
Peace Together - (Charity) - "Be Still" (1993)
The God Machine - "Home" (1993)
Rollerskate Skinny - "Miss Leader" (1993)
Cathedral - "Ride" (1993)
Dodgy - "So Let Me Go Far" (1993)
Dodgy - "Making The Most Of" (1993)
Carter USM - "Lets Get Tattoos" (1993)
Carter USM - "Young Offender's Mum" (1993)
Carter USM - "Born On The 5th November" (1994)
18 Wheeler - "Crabs" (1994)
Chris Braide - "Heavenly Rain" (1995)
Capercaillie - "Breisleach" (1995)

Other
The House of Love @ The Tasco Warehouse (1991) - Concert
My Bloody Valentine - Rollercoaster Tour (1991) - Tour Projections
The Manic Street Preachers @ The Marquee (1991) BBC - Concert
My Bloody Valentine - 2008 Tour - Tour Projections

References

External links
Angus Cameron official website

Angus Cameron at the British Film Institute
Angus Cameron at the Music Video Database

1964 births
Living people
People educated at Strathallan School
British film directors
British television directors
British music video directors
My Bloody Valentine (band)